Midlands 5 West (South) is a level 10 English Rugby Union league and level 5 of the Midlands League, made up of teams from the West Midlands region including clubs from parts of Birmingham and the West Midlands, Herefordshire, Shropshire, Staffordshire, Warwickshire, Worcestershire and even (on occasion) Cheshire and Oxfordshire, with home and away matches played throughout the season.  Each year some of the clubs in this division also take part in the RFU Junior Vase - a level 9-12 national competition.

Formed in 2006 originally the league was divided into two regional divisions – Midlands 6 South-East and South-West – but was merged into a single division for the 2010–11 season. In its present state promoted teams typically move up to either Midlands 4 West (North) or Midlands 4 West (South) with there being no relegation as it is the basement division for Midlands rugby.  There was also another regional tier 5 Midlands league - Midlands 5 West (North) - but this league was discontinued at the end of the 2018–19 season, with most teams transferred into a new-look Midlands 5 West (South).

2021–22

Dixonians, who finished 11th in 2019-20, did not return for the current season.

2020–21
Due to the COVID-19 pandemic, the 2020–21 season was cancelled.

2019–20

2018–19

2017–18

Teams 2016-17
Atherstone (relegated from Midlands 4 West (South))
Birmingham Civil Service (relegated from Midlands 4 West (South))
Birmingham Exiles
Copsewood
Rugby Welsh	
Trinity Guild
Wellesbourne

Teams 2015-16
Birmingham Exiles	
Copsewood
Five Ways Old Edwardians (relegated from Midlands 4 West (South))
Keresley
Rugby Welsh	
Trinity Guild
Wellesbourne

Teams 2014-15
Alcester (relegated from Midlands 4 West (South))
Birmingham Civil Service (relegated from Midlands 4 West (South))
Birmingham Exiles	
Copsewood
Coventry Technical	
Keresley
Rugby Welsh	
Trinity Guild
Wellesbourne

Teams 2013-14
Birmingham Exiles
Copsewood
Coventry Technical
Keresley
Rugby Lions
Rugby Welsh
Trinity Guild
Warwickian
Wellesbourne

Teams 2012–13
Birmingham Exiles
Copsewood
Coventry Technical
Greyhound
Rugby Welsh
Stoke Old Boys
Trinity Guild
Wellesbourne

Teams 2008–09
Copsewood
Coventrians
Coventry Welsh
Dudley Wasps
Evesham
Harbury
Keresley
Manor Park
Pinley
Redditch
Stoke Old Boys
Worcester Students

Worcester Students withdrew from the league after failing to field 15 players regularly.

Original teams

When this division was introduced in 2006 it was split into two separate divisions - Midlands 6 West (South-East) and Midlands 6 West (South-West) - containing the following teams:

Midlands 6 West (South-East)
Atherstone - transferred from Warwickshire 2 (5th)
Coventrians - transferred from Warwickshire 2 (runners up)
Coventry Saracens - transferred from Warwickshire 2 (9th)
Manor Park - transferred from Warwickshire 1 (9th)
Old Wheatleyans - transferred from Warwickshire 2 (4th)
Pinley - transferred from Warwickshire 1 (8th)
Rugby Welsh - transferred from Warwickshire 2 (3rd)
Standard - transferred from Warwickshire 2 (8th)
Trinity Guild - transferred from Warwickshire 1 (10th)
Warwickian - transferred from Warwickshire 2 (6th)

Midlands 6 West (South-West)
Birmingham Civil Service - transferred from North Midlands (South) 2 (5th)
Birmingham Exiles - transferred from North Midlands (South) 2 (8th)
Bromyard - transferred from North Midlands (South) 2 (6th)
Chaddesley Corbett - transferred from North Midlands (South) 2 (runners up)
Claverdon - transferred from Warwickshire 2 (7th)
Clee Hill - transferred from North Midlands (South) 2 (4th)
Dudley Wasps - transferred from North Midlands (South) 2 (3rd)
Redditch - transferred from North Midlands (South) 1 (7th)
Warley - relegated from Midlands 5 West (North) (8th)

Midlands 5 West (South) honours

Midlands 6 West (South-East) / (South-West) (2006–2009)

The league was originally divided into two sub-divisions known as Midlands 6 West (South-East) and Midlands 6 West (South-West).  These divisions were introduced along with their counterpart Midlands 6 West (North) at tier 10 to replace the discontinued North Midlands 2, Warwickshire 1 and Warwickshire 2 leagues.  Promotion was to Midlands 5 West (South) and there was no relegation.

Midlands 5 West (South-East) / (South-West) (2009–2010)

Further league restructuring by the RFU meant that Midlands 6 West (South-East / South-West) and their counterpart Midlands 6 West (North) were renamed as Midlands 5 West (South-East / South-West) and Midlands 5 West (North), with all leagues remaining at tier 10.  Promotion was now to Midlands 4 West (South) (formerly Midlands 5 West (South)) and there was no relegation.

Midlands 5 West (South) (2009–present)

Midlands 5 West (South-East / South West) were remerged into a single tier 10 division ahead of the 2010–11 season.  Promotion continued to Midlands 4 West (South) and there was no relegation.

Promotion play-offs

Between 2007 and 2010 there was a promotion playoff between the runners-up of Midlands 5 West (South-East) and Midlands 5 West (South-West) for the third and final promotion place to Midlands 4 West (South), with the team with the superior league record having home advantage in the tie.  The playoffs were dissolved at the end of the 2009-10 season when Midlands 5 West (South) became one division.  By the end of the promotion play-offs the Midlands 5 West (South-East) teams won all four playoff games and the home team has also won promotion on all four occasions.

Number of league titles

Birmingham Exiles (2)
Rugby Welsh (2)
Stoke Old Boys (2)
Aldridge (1)
Birmingham Civil Service (1)
Burbage (1)
Claverdon (1)
Clee Hill (1)
Coventrians (1)
Dudley Wasps (1)
Keresley (1)
Pinley (1)
Redditch (1)
Rugby Lions (1)
Trinity Guild (1)

Notes

See also
Midlands RFU
North Midlands RFU
Warwickshire RFU
English rugby union system
Rugby union in England

References

Rugby First: To view previous seasons in the league, search for any club within that league then click on to club details followed by fixtures and then select the appropriate season.

6